Idrettslaget Polarstjernen is a Norwegian sports club from Vestre Jakobselv, Vadsø, Finnmark. It has sections for association football, cycling, biathlon, and skiing.

The men's football team is currently defunct. It last played in the Norwegian Second Division in 1998 and the Norwegian Third Division in 2004.

The women's football team plays in the Second Division.

References

 Official site 

Football clubs in Norway
Sport in Finnmark
Vadsø
Association football clubs established in 1917
1917 establishments in Norway